JSSP, or JavaScript Server Pages, is an open source project that implements JavaScript directly on a web server, as source code embedded in HTML and parsed without being sent to the user, much the way VBScript is in ASP.

External links
JSSP at Sourceforge.net

JavaScript programming tools